The first island chain refers to the first chain of major Pacific archipelagos out from the East Asian continental mainland coast. It is principally composed of the Kuril Islands, the Japanese archipelago, the Ryukyu Islands, Taiwan (Formosa), the northern Philippines, and Borneo, hence extending all the way from the Kamchatka Peninsula in the northeast to the Malay Peninsula in the southwest. Some definitions of the first island chain anchor the northern end on the Russian Far East coast north of Sakhalin Island, with Sakhalin Island being the first link in the chain. However, others consider the Aleutian Islands as the farthest north-eastern first link in the chain. The first island chain forms one of three island chain doctrines within the island chain strategy in US foreign policy.
Much of the first island chain is roughly situated in waters claimed by China. These include the South China Sea, within the nine-dash line, as well as the East China Sea west of the Okinawa Trough.

Strategic value

United States
US General Douglas MacArthur pointed out that before World War II, the US protected its western shores with a line of defense from Hawaii, Guam, to the Philippines. However, this line of defense was attacked by Japan with the Pearl Harbor bombing of 1941, thereby drawing the US into the war. The US subsequently launched the air Raid on Taipei (called Taihoku under Japan's empire) and launched the atomic bombings of Hiroshima and Nagasaki. The WW2 victory allowed the US to expand its line of defense further west to the coast of Asia, and thus the US controlled the first island chain. Between the end of WW2 and the Korean War, MacArthur praised Taiwan, located at the midpoint of the first island chain, as an 'unsinkable aircraft carrier'. 

In April 2014, the United States Naval Institute (USNI) assessed that the first island chain is the most effective point to counter any Chinese invasion. The US could not only cut off the People's Liberation Army Navy from entering the western Pacific, but also predict where they may move before trying to break through in the first place. The US and first chain countries are able to coordinate because of the US military's freedom of navigation in the first chain block. In June 2019, USNI called for a blockade of the first island chain if armed conflict broke out between China and the United States.

Andrew Krepinevich argued that an "archipelagic defense" of the countries that make up the first island chain would make up a big part of the implementation of the national defense strategy of 2018. A 2019 report by the Center for Strategic and Budgetary Assessments "proposes a U.S. military strategy of Maritime Pressure and a supporting joint operational concept, “Inside-Out” Defense, to stabilize the military balance in the Western Pacific and deny China the prospect of a successful fait accompli." The first island chain plays a central role in the report. In 2020, the United States Marine Corps started shifting its tactics in conjunction with the United States Navy to be deployed along or near the first island chain. In 2021, the United States Marine Corps announced a goal of three additional Pacific-based regiments.

Chinese mainland 
According to a 2018 United States Department of Defense report to Congress, the People's Liberation Army's Anti-Access/Area Denial military capabilities aimed at the first island chain are its most robust. The report also stated that the People's Liberation Army Navy's ability to perform missions beyond the first island chain is "modest but growing as it gains experience operating in distant waters and acquires larger and more advanced platforms."

Japan 
Around 2009 Japanese military strategist Toshi Yoshihara and Naval War College professor James R. Holmes suggested the American military could exploit the geography of the first island chain to counter the People's Liberation Army Navy build-up. The Cabinet of Japan has also passed defense white papers emphasizing the threat posed by the People's Liberation Army Navy in the first island chain.

In the later years of the 2010s, Japan started deploying military assets to Yonaguni and its other islands to counter China's presence along that area of the first island chain.

Japan's strategic position in the first island chain began with US-Japan joint efforts to counter Soviet expansion. The Japan Self-Defense Forces currently plays the role of protecting US military bases and preserving military strength in East Asia. As for Japan's Territorial Protection Self-Defense Forces, which mainly rely on islands in southern Japan adjacent to the Yellow Sea and the East China Sea, Japan has military advantages in anti-submarine, air defense and sea mine technologies.

Philippines 
In 2021, Lloyd Austin, on behalf of the United States, thanked his counterpart in the Philippines Delfin Lorenzana for retaining the 70-year-old visiting forces agreement between the two nations.

Taiwan 
In the first island chain, Taiwan is considered of critical strategic importance. It is located at the midpoint of the first chain and occupies a strategic position.

See also
Island chain strategy
United States foreign policy toward the People's Republic of China
AirSea Battle
Bamboo Curtain
Power projection

References

Geopolitics
Military strategy
Military tactics
Military doctrines
Islands